Rwanda competed in the Olympic Games for the first time at the 1984 Summer Olympics in Los Angeles, United States.

Athletics

Men
Track & road events

Women
Track & road events

References
Official Olympic Reports
sports-reference

Nations at the 1984 Summer Olympics
1984
1984 in Rwanda